In geometry, a two-dimensional point group or rosette group is a group of geometric symmetries (isometries) that keep at least one point fixed in a plane. Every such group is a subgroup of the orthogonal group O(2), including O(2) itself. Its elements are rotations and reflections, and every such group containing only rotations is a subgroup of the special orthogonal group SO(2), including SO(2) itself. That group is isomorphic to R/Z and the first unitary group, U(1), a group also known as the circle group.

The two-dimensional point groups are important as a basis for the axial three-dimensional point groups, with the addition of reflections in the axial coordinate. They are also important in symmetries of organisms, like starfish and jellyfish, and organism parts, like flowers.

Discrete groups 

There are two families of discrete two-dimensional point groups, and they are specified with parameter n, which is the order of the group of the rotations in the group.

Intl refers to Hermann–Mauguin notation or international notation, often used in crystallography. In the infinite limit, these groups become the one-dimensional line groups.

If a group is a symmetry of a two-dimensional lattice or grid, then the crystallographic restriction theorem restricts the value of n to 1, 2, 3, 4, and 6 for both families. There are thus 10 two-dimensional crystallographic point groups:
C1, C2, C3, C4, C6, 
D1, D2, D3, D4, D6

The groups may be constructed as follows:
 Cn. Generated by an element also called Cn, which corresponds to a rotation by angle 2π/n. Its elements are E (the identity), Cn, Cn2, ..., Cnn−1, corresponding to rotation angles 0, 2π/n, 4π/n, ..., 2(n − 1)π/n.
 Dn. Generated by element Cn and reflection σ. Its elements are the elements of group Cn, with elements σ, Cnσ, Cn2σ, ..., Cnn−1σ added. These additional ones correspond to reflections across lines with orientation angles 0, π/n, 2π/n, ..., (n − 1)π/n. Dn is thus a semidirect product of Cn and the group (E,σ).

All of these groups have distinct abstract groups, except for C2 and D1, which share abstract group Z2. All of the cyclic groups are abelian or commutative, but only two of the dihedral groups are: D1 ~ Z2 and D2 ~ Z2×Z2. In fact, D3 is the smallest nonabelian group.

For even n, the Hermann–Mauguin symbol nm is an abbreviation for the full symbol nmm, as explained below. The n in the H-M symbol denotes n-fold rotations, while the m denotes reflection or mirror planes.

More general groups 

These groups are readily constructed with two-dimensional orthogonal matrices.

The continuous cyclic group SO(2) or C∞ and its subgroups have elements that are rotation matrices:

where SO(2) has any possible θ. Not surprisingly, SO(2) and its subgroups are all abelian; addition of rotation angles commutes.

For discrete cyclic groups Cn, elements Cnk = R(2πk/n)

The continuous dihedral group O(2) or D∞ and its subgroups with reflections have elements that include not only rotation matrices, but also reflection matrices:

where O(2) has any possible θ. However, the only abelian subgroups of O(2) with reflections are D1 and D2.

For discrete dihedral groups Dn, elements Cnkσ = S(2πk/n)

When one uses polar coordinates, the relationship of these groups to one-dimensional symmetry groups becomes evident.

Types of subgroups of SO(2):
finite cyclic subgroups Cn (n ≥ 1); for every n there is one isometry group, of abstract group  type Zn
finitely generated groups, each   isomorphic to one of the form Zm Z n generated by Cn and m independent rotations with an irrational number of turns, and m, n ≥ 1; for each pair (m, n) there are uncountably many isometry groups, all the same as abstract group; for the pair (1, 1) the group is cyclic.
other countable subgroups. For example, for an integer n, the group generated by all rotations of a number of turns equal to a negative integer power of n
uncountable subgroups, including SO(2) itself

For every subgroup of SO(2) there is a corresponding uncountable class of subgroups of O(2) that are mutually isomorphic as abstract group: each of the subgroups in one class is generated by the first-mentioned subgroup and a single reflection in a line through the origin. These are the (generalized) dihedral groups, including the finite ones Dn (n ≥ 1) of abstract group type Dihn. For n = 1 the common notation is Cs, of abstract group type Z2.

As topological subgroups of O(2), only the finite isometry groups and SO(2) and O(2) are closed.

These groups fall into two distinct families, according to whether they consist of rotations only, or include reflections. The cyclic groups, Cn (abstract group type Zn), consist of rotations by 360°/n, and all integer multiples. For example, a four-legged stool has symmetry group C4, consisting of rotations by 0°, 90°, 180°, and 270°. The symmetry group of a square belongs to the family of dihedral groups, Dn  (abstract group type Dihn), including as many reflections as rotations. The infinite rotational symmetry of the circle implies reflection symmetry as well, but formally the circle group S1 is distinct from Dih(S1) because the latter explicitly includes the reflections.

An infinite group need not be continuous; for example, we have a group of all integer multiples of rotation by 360°/, which does not include rotation by 180°. Depending on its application, homogeneity up to an arbitrarily fine level of detail in a transverse direction may be considered equivalent to full homogeneity in that direction, in which case these symmetry groups can be ignored.

Cn and Dn for n = 1, 2, 3, 4, and 6 can be combined with translational symmetry, sometimes in more than one way. Thus these 10 groups give rise to 17 wallpaper groups.

Symmetry groups
The 2D symmetry groups correspond to the isometry groups, except that symmetry according to O(2) and SO(2) can only be distinguished in the generalized symmetry concept applicable for vector fields.

Also, depending on application, homogeneity up to arbitrarily fine detail in transverse direction may be considered equivalent to full homogeneity in that direction. This greatly simplifies the categorization: we can restrict ourselves to the closed topological subgroups of O(2): the finite ones and O(2) (circular symmetry), and for vector fields SO(2).

These groups also correspond to the one-dimensional symmetry groups, when wrapped around in a circle.

Combinations with translational symmetry
E(2) is a semidirect product of O(2) and the translation group T. In other words, O(2) is a subgroup of E(2) isomorphic to the quotient group of E(2) by T:
O(2)  E(2) / T

There is a "natural" surjective group homomorphism p : E(2) → E(2)/ T, sending each element g of E(2) to the coset of T to which g belongs, that is: p (g) = gT, sometimes called the canonical projection of E(2) onto  E(2) / T or O(2). Its kernel is T.

For every subgroup of E(2) we can consider its image under p: a point group consisting of the cosets to which the elements of the subgroup belong, in other words, the point group obtained by ignoring translational parts of isometries. For every discrete subgroup of E(2), due to the crystallographic restriction theorem, this point group is either Cn or of type Dn for n = 1, 2, 3, 4, or 6.

Cn and Dn for n = 1, 2, 3, 4, and 6 can be combined with translational symmetry, sometimes in more than one way. Thus these 10 groups give rise to 17 wallpaper groups, and the four groups with n = 1 and 2, give also rise to 7 frieze groups.

For each of the wallpaper groups p1, p2, p3, p4, p6, the image under p of all isometry groups (i.e. the "projections" onto E(2) / T or O(2) ) are all equal to the corresponding Cn; also two frieze groups correspond to C1 and C2.

The isometry groups of p6m are each mapped to one of the point groups of type D6. For the other 11 wallpaper groups, each isometry group is mapped to one of the point groups of the types D1, D2, D3, or D4. Also five frieze groups correspond to D1 and D2.

For a given hexagonal  translation lattice there are two different groups D3, giving rise to P31m and p3m1. For each of the types D1, D2, and D4 the distinction between the 3, 4, and 2 wallpaper groups, respectively, is determined by the translation vector associated with each reflection in the group: since isometries are in the same coset regardless of translational components, a reflection and a glide reflection with the same mirror are in the same coset. Thus, isometry groups of e.g. type p4m and p4g are both mapped to point groups of type D4.

For a given isometry group, the conjugates of a translation in the group by the elements of the group generate a translation group (a lattice)—that is a subgroup of the isometry group that only depends on the translation we started with, and the point group associated with the isometry group. This is because the conjugate of the translation by a glide reflection is the same as by the corresponding reflection: the translation vector is reflected.

If the isometry group contains an n-fold rotation then the lattice has n-fold symmetry for even n and 2n-fold for odd n. If, in the case of a discrete isometry group containing a translation, we apply this for a translation of minimum length, then, considering the vector difference of translations in two adjacent directions, it follows that n ≤ 6, and for odd n that 2n ≤ 6, hence n = 1, 2, 3, 4, or 6 (the crystallographic restriction theorem).

See also
 Point group
 Point groups in three dimensions
 Point groups in four dimensions
 One-dimensional symmetry group

External links 
 , Geometric Transformations and Wallpaper Groups: Symmetries of Geometric Patterns (Discrete Groups of Isometries), by Lance Drager.
  Point Groups and Crystal Systems, by Yi-Shu Wei, pp. 4–5
 The Geometry Center: 2.1 Formulas for Symmetries in Cartesian Coordinates (two dimensions)

Euclidean symmetries
Group theory